In physics, mirror nuclei are a pair of isotopes of two different elements where the number of protons of isotope one (Z1) equals the number of neutrons of isotope two (N2) and the number of protons of isotope two (Z2) equals the number of neutrons in isotope one (N1); in short: Z1 = N2 and Z2 = N1. This implies that the mass numbers of the isotopes are the same: N1 + Z1 = N2 + Z2.

Examples of mirror nuclei:

Pairs of mirror nuclei have the same spin and parity. If we constrain to odd number of nucleons (A=Z+N) then we find mirror nuclei that differ from one another by exchanging a proton by a neutron. Interesting to observe is their binding energy which is mainly due to the strong interaction and also due to Coulomb interaction. Since the strong interaction is invariant to protons and neutrons one can expect these mirror nuclei to have very similar binding energies.

In 2020 strontium-73 and bromine-73 were found to not behave as expected.

References

Atomic physics